Hansom Books was a British publisher founded in 1950 by Philip Dosse to produce the magazine Dance and Dancers. Magazines in a similar format were then founded to cover other arts, so forming the Seven Arts Group. The other titles were Art and Artists, Books and Bookmen, Films and Filming, Music and Musicians, Plays and Players, and Records and Recording.

In 1956, the young Australian journalist Val Wake worked for Plays and Players as a junior play reviewer. The editor at the time was Frank Granville Baker. Another Australian Evan Senior was editor of Music and Musicians. At the time the editorial team for all six titles was accommodated in the basement of a building near Victoria Station, London. Each title had its own desk. Wake was courting his future wife, Canadian-born Lillian Louise Lequereux, at the time, and was able to take his girlfriend to many of the fringe theatre events taking place in London, at no cost to him; Lequereux was impressed. None of Wake's published reviews seemed to have survived and none of the plays he reviewed did either.

The group went bankrupt in 1980 and Dosse then committed suicide. The publications were sold and publication continued.

References

Magazine publishing companies of the United Kingdom
Publishing companies established in 1950
British companies established in 1950
Publishing companies disestablished in 1980
1980 disestablishments in England
British companies disestablished in 1980